Flash Pass is Six Flags's version of a virtual queue system for their amusement rides and water rides that is themed to the DC Comics superhero The Flash. It is available at all Six Flags parks, and including nine water parks in 2012.

Type of Flash Pass

Six Flags Great Escape and Hurricane Harbor

At Six Flags Great Escape and Hurricane Harbor, the Flash Pass is called the Go Fast Pass.
 Balloon Race
 Cannonball Express
 Flashback
 Storytown Train
 Screaming Eagles
 Grand Carousel
 Flying Trapeze 
 Island Air Adventures
 Spruces Wilderness Bus Tour
 Sheldon’s Speedway 
 Rocky’s Ranger Planes
 Ranger Randy’s Railway
 Oakleys Honey Swings
 Hooties Treehouse 
 Frankie’s Mine Train
 Convoy
 Canyon Blaster
 Desperado Plunge
 Sasquatch
 Steamin' Demon
 Condor
 Thunder Alley
 Sky Ride
 Blizzard
 Comet
 Raging River
 Marshal's Stampede
 Extreme Supernova
 Greezed Lightnin'
 Pandemonium

Frontier City

 Brain Drain
 Diamondback
 Mystery River Log Flume
 Quick Draw
 Renegade Rapids
 Silver Bullet
 Steel Lasso
 Wildcat

La Ronde

 Bateau Pirate
 Boomerang
 Condor
 Chaos
 Demon
 Ednör – L'Attaque
 Goliath
 Orbite
 Tour de Ville
 Titan
 Vampire
 Vertigo
 Vol Ultime

Six Flags America

 Batwing
 Roar
 Bourbon Street Fireball
 Superman – Ride of Steel
 The Joker's Jinx
 Mind Eraser
 The Penguin's Blizzard River
 The Wild One
 Voodoo Drop
 Shipwreck Falls
 Rajin' Cajun
 Firebird
 Wonder Woman Lasso of Truth
 Harley Quinn Spinsanity

Hurricane Harbor:
 Bahama Blast
 Paradise Plunge 
 Reef Runner
 Shark Attack
 Bonzai Pipelines

Six Flags Discovery Kingdom

 Boomerang
 Cobra
 Medusa
 The Joker
 The Penguin
 Wonder Woman Lasso of Truth (single time through)
 Batman The Ride
 Congo Queen
 Dare Devil Chaos Coaster
 Hammered Shark
 Road Runner Express
 Safari Jeep Tours
 Scat-A-Bout
 Sky Screamer
 Superman Ultimate Flight
 The Ark
 Flash Vertical Velocity 
 The Joker
 White Water Safari
 Sidewinder Safari

Six Flags Fiesta Texas

 Batman: The Ride
 Boomerang
 Bugs' White Water Rapids
 Daredevil Dive Flying Machines (single reservation on platinum only)
 Dr. Diabolical's Cliffhanger (single reservation on platinum only)
 Fireball
 Iron Rattler
 Goliath
 Gully Washer
 Hurricane Force 5
 The Joker Carnival of Chaos (single reservation on gold/platinum only)
 Pandemonium
 Poltergeist
 Pirates of the Deep Sea
 Road Runner Express
 Scream
 Superman: Krypton Coaster
 Wonder Woman Golden Lasso Coaster (single reservation)

Six Flags Great Adventure

 Batman: The Ride
 The Big Wheel
 Medusa
 Buccaneer
 Congo Rapids
 Cyborg CyberSpin
 The Dark Knight Coaster
 El Toro
 Green Lantern
 Kingda Ka
 Zumanjaro: Drop of Doom 
 Nitro
 Runaway Mine Train
 Safari Off Road Adventure
 Saw Mill Log Flume
 Skull Mountain
 Sky Screamer 
 Superman: Ultimate Flight
 Twister
 Justice League: Battle for Metropolis
 The Joker
 Jersey Devil Coaster

Six Flags Great America

 AQUAMAN Splashdown
 Batman: The Ride
 Demon
 Giant Drop
 Goliath
 Justice League: Battle for Metropolis
 Logger's Run
 Mardi Gras Hangover
 Maxx Force (single reservation on platinum only)
 Raging Bull
 Revolution 
 Roaring Rapids
 Rue Le Dodge
 Superman: Ultimate Flight
 The Dark Knight Coaster
 The Flash: Vertical Velocity
 The Joker: Free Fly Coaster
 Viper
 Whizzer
 X-Flight

Six Flags Magic Mountain

 Apocalypse
 Batman: The Ride
 CraZanity (single reservation only)
 Twisted Colossus
 Full Throttle (single reservation)
 Goldrusher
 Goliath
 Jet Stream
 Justice League: Battle for Metropolis
 Lex Luthor: Drop of Doom 
 Ninja
 The New Revolution
 Riddler's Revenge
 Roaring Rapids
 Scream
 Tatsu
 Viper
 Wonder Woman Flight of Courage (single reservation on platinum only)
 X2 (single reservation)
 West Coast Racers (single reservation only)

Six Flags México

 Aquaman Splashdown
 Batman: The Ride
 Boomerang 
 CraZanity 
 The Dark Knight Coaster
 The Joker
 Justice League: Battle for Metropolis
 Kilahuea Triple Torre 
 Medusa Steel Coaster
 Río Salvaje
 Supergirl Sky Flight
 Superman el Último Escape
 Wonder Woman Coaster

Six Flags New England

 Batman — The Dark Knight
 Superman: The Ride
 Blizzard River
 Catwoman's Whip
 Fireball
 Flashback
 Gotham City Gauntlet: Escape from Arkham Asylum
 Kryptonite Kollider
 Mind Eraser
 New England SkyScreamer
 Pandemonium
 Scream!
 Wicked Cyclone
 Harley Quinn Spinsanity
 Thunderbolt
 The Joker

Six Flags Over Georgia

 Acrophobia
 Batman: The Ride(single reservation only)
 Dahlonega Mine Train
 Cat woman Whip
 Poison Ivy Toxic spin
 DC Super-Villains Swing
 Justice League 
 Pandemonium 
 Dare Devil Dive (single reservation only)
 Dodge City Bumper Cars
 Twisted Cyclone
 Georgia Scorcher
 Goliath
 Gotham City Crime Wave
 Great American Scream Machine
 The Riddler Mindbender
 Monster Mansion
 Blue Hawk
 SkyScreamer
 Splashwater Falls
 Superman: Ultimate Flight
 Thunder River
 The Joker Funhouse Coaster
 The Joker Chaos Coaster

Six Flags Over Texas

 Batman: The Ride
 Aquaman Power Wave 
 Catwoman Whip
 Antique Cars
 El Aserradero 
 El Diablo
 Justice League: Battle for Metropolis 
 La Vibora
 Mr. Freeze
 New Texas Giant 
 Pandemonium
 Roaring Rapids
 Runaway Mountain
 Texas SkyScreamer
 Superman: Tower of Power
 the riddler revenge 
 pirates of speelunker cave
 Titan
 Shockwave
 The Joker 
Six Flags Hurricane Harbor:

Six Flags St. Louis

 American Thunder
 The Boss
 Batman: The Ride
 Boomerang 
 Fireball 
 Justice League: Battle for Metropolis 
 Mr. Freeze: Reverse Blast
 Ninja
 Pandemonium
 Super Girl Skyflyer 
 Log Flume
 River King Mine Train
 Thunder River

Six Flags White Water

 Bahama Bob Slide
 Bermuda Triangle
 Black River Falls
 Wahoo Racer
 Caribbean Plunge
 Dragon's Tail
 Gulf Screamer
 The Rapids
 Runaway River
 Tornado

See also
 Disney's Fastpass, the virtual queue system for the Disney Parks
 Fast Lane, the virtual queue system for the Cedar Fair Parks
 Flash Pass, the virtual queue system for the Six Flags Parks
 Six Flags

References

Amusement rides lists
The Great Escape and Hurricane Harbor
La Ronde (amusement park)
Six Flags
Six Flags America
Six Flags Discovery Kingdom
Six Flags Fiesta Texas
Six Flags Great Adventure
Six Flags Great America
Six Flags Magic Mountain
Six Flags México
Six Flags New England
Six Flags Over Georgia
Six Flags Over Texas
Six Flags St. Louis